Tannhäuser, often stylized, "The Tannhäuser," was a German Minnesinger and traveling poet. Historically, his biography, including the dates he lived, is obscure beyond the poetry, which suggests he lived between 1245 and 1265.

His name becomes associated with a "fairy queen"-type folk ballad in German folklore of the 16th century.

Historical Tannhäuser
The most common tradition has him as a descent from the Tanhusen family of Imperial ministeriales, documented in various 13th century sources, with their residence in the area of Neumarkt in the Bavarian Nordgau. These sources identify him as being descended of an Old Styrian noble family.

The illustrated Codex Manesse manuscript (about 1300–1340) depicts him clad in the Teutonic Order habit, suggesting he might have fought in the Sixth Crusade led by Emperor Frederick II in 1228/29. 
For a while, Tannhäuser was an active courtier at the court of the Austrian duke Frederick the Warlike, who ruled from 1230 to 1246. Frederick was the last of the Babenberg dukes; upon his death in the Battle of the Leitha River, Tannhäuser left the Vienna court.

Tannhäuser was a proponent of the leich (lai) style of minnesang and dance-song poetry. As literature, his poems parody the traditional genre with irony and hyperbole, somewhat similar to later commercium songs. However, his Bußlied (Poem on Atonement) is unusual, given the eroticism of the remaining Codex Manesse.

Tannhäuser legend

Based on his Bußlied, Tannhäuser became the subject of a legendary account. It makes Tannhäuser a knight and poet who found the Venusberg, the subterranean home of Venus, and spent a year there worshipping the goddess. After leaving the Venusberg, Tannhäuser is filled with remorse, and travels to Rome to ask Pope Urban IV (reigned 1261–1264) if it is possible to be absolved of his sins. Urban replies that forgiveness is impossible, as much as it would be for his papal staff to blossom. Three days after Tannhäuser's departure, Urban's staff bloomed with flowers; messengers are sent to retrieve the knight, but he has already returned to Venusberg, never to be seen again.

The Venusberg legend has been interpreted in terms of a Christianised version of the well-known folk-tale type of a mortal visiting the Otherworld: A human being seduced by an elf or fairy experiences the delights of the enchanted realm but later the longing for his earthly home is overwhelming. His desire is granted, but he is not happy (often noting that many years have passed in the world during his absence) and in the end returns to fairy-land.

The Venusberg legend has no counterpart in Middle High German literature associated with Tannhäuser. Venusberg as a name of the "Otherworld" is first mentioned in German in Formicarius by Johannes Nider (1437/38) in the context of the rising interest in witchcraft at the time.
The earliest version of the narrative of the Tannhäuser legend, as yet without association with the figure of Tannhäuser, and naming a "Sibylla" instead of Venus as the queen in the mountain, is  recorded  in the form of a ballad by the Provençal writer Antoine de la Sale, part of the compilation known as La Salade (c. 1440).

The association of the narrative of La Sale's ballad, which was likely based on an Italian original, with the name of Tannhäuser, appears to take place in the early 16th century.
A German Tannhäuser folk ballad is recorded in numerous versions beginning around 1510, 
both in High German and Low German variants. Folkloristic versions were still collected from oral tradition in the early- to mid-20th century, especially in the Alpine region (a Styrian variant with the name Waldhauser was collected in 1924). Early written transmission around the 1520s was by the means of printed single sheets popular at the time, with examples known from Augsburg, Leipzig, Straubing, Vienna, and Wolfenbüttel.
The earliest extant version is from Jörg Dürnhofers Liederbuch, printed by Gutknecht of Nuremberg in ca. 1515. The popularity of the ballad continues unabated well into the 17th century. Versions are recorded by Heinrich Kornmann (1614), Johannes Preatorius (1668).

Modern reception
The Preatorius version  was included in the Des Knaben Wunderhorn folksong collection by Clemens Brentano and Achim von Arnim in 1806.
The folk ballad was adapted by Ludwig Tieck (Der getreue Eckart und der Tannhäuser, 1799) and Heinrich Heine (1836). 
Richard Wagner adapted the legend in his three-act opera Tannhäuser, completed in 1845. The plot of the opera covers both the Tannhäuser legend and the epic of the Sängerkrieg at Wartburg Castle. 
Aubrey Beardsley started to write an erotic treatment of the legend which was never to be finished due to his conversion to Catholicism, repudiation of his past works, and subsequent illness and death; the first parts of it were published in The Savoy and later issued in book form by Leonard Smithers with the title Under the Hill. In 1907, the original manuscript was published and entitled The Story of Venus and Tannhäuser.

John Heath-Stubbs wrote a poem on the legend called " Tannhauser's End" (Collected Poems page 294). Aleister Crowley wrote a play called Tannhauser which follows the characters Tannhauser and Venus. English poet Algernon Charles Swinburne's "Laus Veneris" ("In Praise of Venus") is a telling of the Tannhauser legend. Swinburne also composed the medieval French epigraph that purports to be its source.

William Morris retells the story in "The Hill of Venus", the final story of his epic 1868-1870 poem The Earthly Paradise.
Guy Willoughby in his Art and Christhood asserts that the blossoming staff of the eponymous Young King in Oscar Wilde's fairy tale evokes that of Tannhäuser. H.G. Wells' Sleeper watches an adaption in The Sleeper Awakes (1910). He also references it in his short story The Man Who Could Work Miracles (1898).

Author Philip José Farmer references Tannhäuser and Venusberg in the 1967 sci-fi novella Riders of the Purple Wage. The plot of Neil Gaiman's story "Neverwhere" broadly mirrors the Tannhauser legend, as does the BBC TV series Life on Mars.

See also
 Medieval German literature
 Minnesang
 The Woman Who Had No Shadow

References

Bibliography

External links

Wikipedia of the Rindsmaul family
Laus Veneris, and other poems (1900), Swinburne, Algernon Charles, 1837-1909
Encyclopædia Britannica Online - Tannhäuser
 James G. Nelson, Publisher to the Decadents: Leonard Smithers in the Careers of Beardsley, Wilde, Dowson.  Rivendale Press, May 2000. 
A Translation of Grimm's Saga No. 171 "Tannhäuser"
 a collection of his works (original language)

Medieval German knights
Medieval legends
Minnesingers
Middle High German literature
Male composers
13th-century German poets